Violent Night is a 2022 American Christmas action comedy film directed by Tommy Wirkola and written by Pat Casey and Josh Miller. It follows Santa Claus (portrayed by David Harbour) as he fights mercenaries who have taken a wealthy family hostage in their home. The film also stars John Leguizamo, Alex Hassell, Alexis Louder, Edi Patterson, Cam Gigandet, Leah Brady, and Beverly D'Angelo.

Violent Night had its world premiere at the New York Comic Con on October 7, 2022. Universal Pictures released the film in theaters in the United States on December 2, 2022. The film received positive reviews from critics and grossed $76 million worldwide.

Plot

In Greenwich, Connecticut, Jason Lightstone, his estranged wife Linda, and their 7-year-old daughter Trudy visit his mother Gertrude's mansion to celebrate Christmas with his sister Alva, her new boyfriend and wannabe-action star Morgan Steel, and Alva's online streamer son Bertrude. Finding an old walkie-talkie for Trudy to "talk to Santa", Jason and Linda overhear her only wish: to become a family again. Drunkenly delivering gifts, Santa Claus arrives at the Lightstone estate where the caterers reveal themselves to be mercenaries with Christmas-themed codenames. Led by "Mr. Scrooge", they slaughter the staff and take the family hostage. 

Santa is discovered by one of the henchmen, whose gunfire scares away the reindeer, and they fight until Santa knocks him out of a window to his death. Stranded, Santa decides to save Trudy and her family from Scrooge, who demands the $300 million in cash from the mansion's vault. Santa kills another henchman and takes his radio, coming across Trudy's channel, and finds the mercenaries on his magical naughty list. When Trudy's walkie-talkie is discovered, Jason tells their captors that she is simply playing make-believe and declares that Santa is not real, causing her to run and hide in the attic. Santa reassures Trudy over the radio, revealing that he was once Nikamund the Red, a bloodthirsty Viking warrior and finds comfort in his 1,100 years of marriage to Mrs. Claus. Mr. Scrooge's henchman Krampus forces the family to present their gifts to Gertrude, who is surprised by a card from Jason. 

Wounded, Santa is captured by Scrooge who bears a childhood grudge against Christmas. Santa's knowledge of their real identities convinces henchmen Gingerbread and Candy Cane that he is real, and he uses his magic to escape through the chimney, though they burn his magic sack. Gertrude's private "kill squad" led by Commander Thorp arrives, but are in league with Scrooge and kill Morgan when he tries to escape. Finding the vault empty, Scrooge threatens Linda and Jason confesses that he stole the money and was planning to flee with his wife and daughter which he explained in his card to his mother. He reveals the money hidden in a nativity scene outside and Gertrude forgives his treachery as the secret Lightstone rite of passage (having stolen her company from her grandfather), choosing him as her heir.

Retreating to a shed, Santa finds a sledgehammer and brutally slaughters the kill squad. Trudy creates traps inspired by Home Alone, resulting in Gingerbread's death. Candy Cane prepares to shoot her, but she is killed by Santa. Scrooge gives the order to kill the hostages, but Alva, Linda, and Bert manage to kill Krampus instead. Scrooge and Thorp flee into the woods with the money and a captive Gertrude, pursued by Santa. Linda kills the last mercenary and Trudy sees her parents reunite with a kiss. Lured by Scrooge, Santa crashes into a cabin and Scrooge finds himself on the naughty list and acknowledges Santa is real and decides to kill him as he blames Christmas for ruining his childhood. They fight, and Scrooge gains the upper hand, but is instantly killed when Santa uses his magic to drag him up the cabin's chimney, crushing and eviscerating him. 

Santa is fatally shot in the chest by Thorp, who is killed by Gertrude. Despite Jason burning some of the money to keep him warm, Santa succumbs to his wounds. Trudy inspires her family to all declare their belief in Santa, and he is revived, admitting that he still does not really understand how Christmas magic works. His reindeer return (with a note from Mrs. Claus and a new sack of presents) and Santa bids goodbye to Trudy before flying off to finish delivering gifts, his faith in Christmas renewed.

Cast

Production
In March 2020, Universal Pictures announced that it acquired the original screenplay to Violent Night by Pat Casey and Josh Miller and that 87North Productions would produce. In November 2021, David Harbour was cast in the lead role, with Tommy Wirkola set to direct. Wirkola was hired to direct after he sent an early cut of his prior film The Trip to producers at 87North, and after enjoying it, they sent him the Violent Night script. In early 2022, John Leguizamo, Beverly D'Angelo, Alex Hassell, Alexis Louder, Edi Patterson, Cam Gigandet, and André Eriksen were confirmed to star. The shooting of the film took place from January–March 2022.

Release
Violent Night had its world premiere at the New York Comic Con on October 7, 2022. Universal Pictures released the film in the United States and Canada on December 2, 2022.

Home media
Violent Night was released on VOD on December 20, 2022. The film was added to Peacock on January 20, 2023. That same day, it became available for digital purchase, while the Blu-ray and DVD release followed on January 24.

Reception

Box office 

, Violent Night has grossed $50 million in the United States and Canada, and $26.5 million in other territories, for a worldwide total of $76.6 million.

The film was projected to gross around $10 million from 3,682 theaters in its opening weekend. it made $4.9 million on its first day, including $1.1 million from Thursday night previews, and went on to debut to $13.5 million, finishing second behind holdover Black Panther: Wakanda Forever. The film fell 37% in its sophomore weekend to $8.7 million, remaining in second.

Critical reception 

On the review aggregator website Rotten Tomatoes, the film holds an approval rating of 73% based on 203 reviews with an average rating of 6.4/10. The website's critics consensus reads, "Violent Night isn't as wildly entertaining as its concept might suggest, but for those seeking harder-edged holiday fare, it may be a ho-ho-whole lot of fun." Metacritic, which uses a weighted average, assigned the film a score of 55 out of 100, based on 37 critics, indicating "mixed or average reviews".  Opening weekend audiences polled by CinemaScore gave the film an average grade of "B+" on an A+ to F scale, while those at PostTrak gave it an overall positive score of 76%.

MovieWeb wrote, "The first reviews... heap praise on David Harbour's savage Santa Claus." Syfy wrote that "critics hail what might be a new holiday classic that more than earns its R-rating by turning every conceivable Christmas item into a deadly weapon" and that Harbour "steals the show". Total Film wrote that reviews were mixed, "Some critics are calling Tommy Wirkola's movie a fun riff on the festive genre, while others are critical of its plot and length." Box Office Mojo said, "Critics mostly like it."

Future 
In November 2022, Harbour mentioned that there were discussions of Mrs. Claus appearing in a potential sequel during production of the first film. The actor expressed interest in seeing Charlize Theron in the role. In December of the same year, Wirkola confirmed that there have been ongoing discussions between him and the writers; with potential for Mrs. Claus, the North Pole, and the elves factoring into the story. The filmmaker stated that the realization of a follow-up movie depends on the success of the first film. Later that month, producer Kelly McCormick confirmed that all creatives involved intend to make a sequel with work on the project commencing in "the next few weeks". In January 2023, it was confirmed that a sequel is already in the works.

See also
 List of Christmas films
 Santa Claus in film

References

External links
 
 
 Violent Night at Rotten Tomatoes

2020s American films
2020s Christmas comedy films
2020s English-language films
2020s satirical films
2022 action comedy films
2022 black comedy films
American action comedy films
American black comedy films
American Christmas comedy films
American satirical films
Films about mercenaries
Films about robbery
Films directed by Tommy Wirkola
Films scored by Dominic Lewis
Films set in Bristol
Films set in Connecticut
Films set in country houses
Films shot in Winnipeg
Films with screenplays by Josh Miller (filmmaker)
Films with screenplays by Patrick Casey (writer)
Home invasions in film
IMAX films
Santa Claus in film
Universal Pictures films